Krumau am Kamp is a town in the district of Krems-Land in the Austrian state of Lower Austria.

It was the birthplace of the naturalist and army officer Christoph Feldegg (1779–1845)

Population

References

Cities and towns in Krems-Land District